The Dębica trolleybus system was a trolleybus network operated by agro-industrial works Igloopol in Dębica and Straszęcin, Poland between 12 November 1988 and October 1990.

By the standards of the various now-defunct trolleybus systems in Poland, the Dębica system was a very small one, with only two routes, and a maximum fleet of just 10 trolleybuses.

History 
The first construction stage assumed the construction of an overhead line, which was to connect the Dębica railway station with Igloopol plants in Dębica and Straszęcin. The second construction stage involved the expansion of the network in the city center and to Zawada and Latoszyn. On 25 August 1988, the Municipal National Council in Dębica did not agree to the expansion of the network in Dębica (this decision was criticized both by residents and the creator of Dębica trolleybuses, Edward Brzostowski). Currently, the overhead lines do not exist - they have been dismantled. Numerous overhead line poles remained as streetlamps.

Lines

Detailed system scheme

References

Notes

External links

Trolleybus transport in Poland
Defunct trolleybus systems by city
Dębica
1988 establishments in Poland